Daniel Zev Sands, M.D., M.P.H. (also known as Dr. Danny Sands), is a primary care physician, specialist in medical informatics, and co-founder of the Society for Participatory Medicine, of which he is the Board Chair.

Biography 
Dr. Sands was born in April 1962. He has earned degrees from Brown University, Ohio State College of Medicine, Harvard School of Public Health, and trained at Boston City Hospital and Boston’s Beth Israel Hospital (now Beth Israel Deaconess Medical Center).

He has spent more than ten years at Beth Israel Deaconess, where he developed and implemented numerous innovative systems to improve clinical care delivery and patient engagement, including clinical decision support systems, an electronic health record, and PatientSite, one of the nation’s first patient portals. He continues to practice there part-time as a primary physician.

He worked for six years as chief medical informatics officer at Cisco, where he provided both internal and external health IT leadership and helped key healthcare customers with business and clinical transformation using IT. His prior position was Chief Medical Officer for Zix Corporation, where he led work to establish leadership in secure emailing and e-prescribing.

Awards and honors 

 William F. Ashe Award from the Department of Preventive Medicine for work with computers as systems operator of Black Bag II BBS, a computerized medical information system, Ohio State University College of Medicine (1988).
 President’s Award, American Medical Informatics Association (1998).
 2001 Technical Paper of the Year, Health Information Management Systems Society, for paper about PatientSite (2002).
 IT Innovator Award from Healthcare Informatics magazine (a McGraw-Hill publication) (2003).
 20 People Who Make Healthcare Better - Health Leaders magazine, 2009

Memberships 
Dr. Sands has been elected to fellowship in both the American College of Physicians and the American College of Medical Informatics, and is a founder and co-chair of the Society for Participatory Medicine.

Publications 
A Model for the Future of Health Care, Journal of Participatory Medicine, 5/16/2013

References

External links 
 DrDannySands.com (his website)
 Society for Participatory Medicine

American primary care physicians
1962 births
Living people
Ohio State University College of Medicine alumni
Brown University alumni
Harvard School of Public Health alumni